Anna Eufemia Carolina Gräfin von Adlersfeld-Ballestrem (1854–1941) was a German aristocratic novelist.

Early life
She was born in Ratibor, Upper Silesia, as the daughter of Count Alexander von Ballestrem (1806-1881) and his wife, Mathilde von Hertell (1818-1900).

Biography
As a child, she had singing lessons from the Dresden soprano Jenny Bürde-Ney, and herself developed 'a beautiful soprano voice of rare proportions'.   She later settled in Munich. She was one of the few German female writers of the 19th century who did not use a pseudonym.

Personal life
She married Joseph Fritz von Adlersfeld. They had one daughter:
 Dagmar Maria Josepha von Adlersfeld (b. 6 August 1885); married in 1909 to Albert von Bezold (b. 8 January 1869)

Selected works
 Violet (1883)
 The White Roses of Ravensberg (1896)
 The Duchess of Santa Rosa (1924)

Bibliography
 Prawer, S.S. Between Two Worlds: The Jewish Presence in German and Austrian Film, 1910–1933. Berghahn Books, 2007.

References

1854 births
1941 deaths
People from Racibórz
People from the Province of Silesia
German women novelists
German countesses